Muratov (masculine) or Muratova (feminine) is a patronymic surname derived from the given name Murat. 

The surname may refer to:
Dmitry Muratov (b. 1961), Russian editor-in-chief of the Novaya Gazeta newspaper, Nobel Peace Prize laureate
Evgeny Muratov (b. 1981), Russian ice hockey player
Kira Muratova (1934–2018), Ukrainian film director, screenwriter and actress
Zair Muratov (d. 1942), Soviet soldier and prisoner-of-war
Pavel Muratov (1881–1950), Russian writer and historian
Radner Muratov (1928–2004), Russian Tatar actor
Sergey Muratov (1948–2008), Russian association football player and coach
Sofia Muratova (1929–2006), Soviet gymnast
Tatiana Mouratova (Muratova) (b. 1979), Russian pentathlete
Valentin Muratov (1928–2006), Soviet Olympic gymnast
Valery Muratov (b. 1946), Soviet Olympic ice speed skater

See also
Muradov (surname)

Patronymic surnames